This is a timeline of the theory of abelian varieties in algebraic geometry, including elliptic curves.

Early history
 c. 1000 Al-Karaji writes on congruent numbers

Seventeenth century
 Fermat studies descent for elliptic curves
 1643 Fermat poses an elliptic curve Diophantine equation
 1670 Fermat's son published his Diophantus with notes

Eighteenth century
 1718  Giulio Carlo Fagnano dei Toschi, studies the rectification of the lemniscate, addition results for elliptic integrals.
 1736 Leonhard Euler writes on the pendulum equation without the small-angle approximation.
 1738 Euler writes on curves of genus 1 considered by Fermat and Frenicle
 1750 Euler writes on elliptic integrals
 23 December 1751 – 27 January 1752: Birth of the theory of elliptic functions, according to later remarks of Jacobi, as Euler writes on Fagnano's work.
 1775 John Landen publishes Landen's transformation, an isogeny formula.
 1786 Adrien-Marie Legendre begins to write on elliptic integrals
 1797 Carl Friedrich Gauss discovers double periodicity of the lemniscate function
 1799 Gauss finds the connection of the length of a lemniscate and a case of the arithmetic-geometric mean, giving a numerical method for a complete elliptic integral.

Nineteenth century
 1826 Niels Henrik Abel, Abel-Jacobi map
 1827 Inversion of elliptic integrals independently by Abel and Carl Gustav Jacob Jacobi
 1829 Jacobi, Fundamenta nova theoriae functionum ellipticarum, introduces four theta functions of one variable
 1835 Jacobi points out the use of the group law for diophantine geometry, in De usu Theoriae Integralium Ellipticorum et Integralium Abelianorum in Analysi Diophantea
 1836-7 Friedrich Julius Richelot, the Richelot isogeny.<ref>Richelot, Essai sur une méthode générale pour déterminer les valeurs des intégrales ultra-elliptiques, fondée sur des transformations remarquables
de ces transcendantes, C. R. Acad. Sci. Paris. 2 (1836), 622-627; De transformatione integralium Abelianorum primi ordinis commentatio, J. Reine Angew. Math. 16 (1837), 221-341.</ref>
 1847 Adolph Göpel gives the equation of the Kummer surface
 1851 Johann Georg Rosenhain writes a prize essay on the inversion problem in genus 2.
c. 1850 Thomas Weddle - Weddle surface
 1856 Weierstrass elliptic functions
 1857 Bernhard Riemann lays the foundations for further work on abelian varieties in dimension > 1, introducing the Riemann bilinear relations and Riemann theta function.
 1865 Carl Johannes Thomae, Theorie der ultraelliptischen Funktionen und Integrale erster und zweiter Ordnung 1866 Alfred Clebsch and Paul Gordan, Theorie der Abel'schen Functionen 1869 Karl Weierstrass proves an abelian function satisfies an algebraic addition theorem
 1879, Charles Auguste Briot, Théorie des fonctions abéliennes 1880 In a letter to Richard Dedekind, Leopold Kronecker describes his Jugendtraum, to use complex multiplication theory to generate abelian extensions of imaginary quadratic fields
 1884 Sofia Kovalevskaya writes on the reduction of abelian functions to elliptic functions
 1888 Friedrich Schottky finds a non-trivial condition on the theta constants for curves of genus , launching the Schottky problem.
 1891 Appell–Humbert theorem of Paul Émile Appell and Georges Humbert, classifies the holomorphic line bundles on an abelian surface by cocycle data.
 1894 Die Entwicklung der Theorie der algebräischen Functionen in älterer und neuerer Zeit, report by Alexander von Brill and Max Noether
 1895 Wilhelm Wirtinger, Untersuchungen über Thetafunktionen, studies Prym varieties
 1897 H. F. Baker, Abelian Functions: Abel's Theorem and the Allied Theory of Theta FunctionsTwentieth century
 c.1910 The theory of Poincaré normal functions implies that the Picard variety and Albanese variety are isogenous.
1913 Torelli's theorem
 1916 Gaetano Scorza applies the term "abelian variety" to complex tori.
 1921 Solomon Lefschetz shows that any complex torus with Riemann matrix satisfying the necessary conditions can be embedded in some complex projective space using theta-functions
 1922 Louis Mordell proves Mordell's theorem: the rational points on an elliptic curve over the rational numbers form a finitely-generated abelian group
1929 Arthur B. Coble, Algebraic Geometry and Theta Functions1939 Siegel modular forms
 c. 1940 André Weil defines "abelian variety"
 1952 Weil defines an intermediate Jacobian
 Theorem of the cube
 Selmer group
 Michael Atiyah classifies holomorphic vector bundles on an elliptic curve
 1961 Goro Shimura and Yutaka Taniyama, Complex Multiplication of Abelian Varieties and its Applications to Number Theory''
 Néron model
 Birch–Swinnerton–Dyer conjecture
 Moduli space for abelian varieties
 Duality of abelian varieties
 c.1967 David Mumford develops a new theory of the equations defining abelian varieties
 1968 Serre–Tate theorem on good reduction extends the results of Max Deuring on elliptic curves to the abelian variety case.
c. 1980 Mukai–Fourier transform: the Poincaré line bundle as Mukai–Fourier kernel induces an equivalence of the derived categories of coherent sheaves for an abelian variety and its dual.
1983 Takahiro Shiota proves Novikov's conjecture on the Schottky problem
1985 Jean-Marc Fontaine shows that any positive-dimensional abelian variety over the rationals has bad reduction somewhere.

Twenty-first century
 2001 Proof of the modularity theorem for elliptic curves is completed.

Notes

Abelian varieties
Abelian varieties